The Green Scapular (also called The Badge of the Immaculate Heart of Mary) is a Roman Catholic devotional article approved by Pope Pius IX in 1870. It is called a scapular due to its appearance, but is not descended from the scapulars that form part of the habit worn by religious orders. It can be more accurately described as a "cloth medal". It is unique among Catholic scapulars, as it the only scapular which has only one badge of cloth, while all others have at least two. 

The development of the green scapular is based on visions reportedly experienced in 1840 by Sister Justine Bisqueyburu, a member of the Daughters of Charity of Saint Vincent de Paul.

Background
Almost ten years after Saint Catherine Labouré, a member of the same Congregation of the Daughters of Charity, reported several apparitions of the Blessed Virgin Mary, in 1830, at the motherhouse in the Rue du Bac, Paris, that resulted on the creation of the Miraculous Medal of Our Lady of Graces. According to Chris Maunder, the visions of the Rue du Bac inspired other similar accounts among the French Vincentian nuns during the 1840s. 

A second Daughter of Charity of St Vincent de Paul, Sister Justine Bisqueyburu, reported a similar experience in 1840, that led to the creation of the Green Scapular. In 1846 Sister Apolline Andriveaut purportedly received a vision at Troyes, France, that formed the basis of the Red Scapular of the Passion.

Justine Bisqueyburu

Early life
Justine Bisqueyburu was born on 11 November 1817 in Mauléon, Lower Pyrenees, France, to Clement and Ursula Albine d'Anglade Bisqueyburu. Her father was a merchant. Orphaned at a young age, she was brought up by her maternal aunt. On 28 January 1840, during her retreat in preparation for entrance into the Daughters of Charity, Justine was in the chapel at Rue du Bac in Paris. While she was at prayer, the Virgin Mary reportedly appeared to her, dressed in a long white gown and a light blue mantle; her hair was not covered, and she said nothing. At the end of the retreat, the Virgin Mary appeared to her again, and the vision recurred five times during the latter's novitiate. On each occasion, the vision was identical to the first; on each occasion, Our Lady said nothing.

Visions
Shortly after she had received the habit of the Daughters of Charity, Sr Justine was sent to teach the poor in Blangy. On 8 September 1840 (the Feast of the Nativity of Mary), while Sr Justine was at prayer, the Virgin Mary again appeared, holding in her right hand her heart surrounded by flames, and in her left a type of scapular consisting of a single piece of green cloth strung on green cords. On the cloth was an image of the Virgin as she had appeared to Sr Justine, holding her heart in her right hand. On the cloth's reverse was "a Heart all ablaze with rays more dazzling than the sun and as transparent as crystal". The heart was pierced by a sword, surmounted by a gold cross and with words in the shape of an oval around the heart: "Immaculate Heart of Mary, pray for us now and at the hour of our death". Sr Justine heard an interior voice say that the Virgin Mary wished the scapular to be promoted widely as an instrument in the conversion of souls. 
Sr Justine told her superior about the visions and, subsequently, her spiritual director, Jean-Marie Aladel, C.M. who was skeptical and told her she was deluded.

Later life
During the Crimean War, Sr Justine was sent to serve in Constantinople. In 1856 she went to the military hospital at Val-de-Grâce in Paris, where she remained for two years. In 1858 she was commissioned to open the military hospital of Rennes; later that year she was placed in charge of a military hospital in Algiers, a position she held for nine years.

In 1867, her superiors sent her to Italy in the service of the Papal Zouaves. After spending three days and three nights on the battlefield, she went to Rome to equip and organize three ambulances. She was held in high esteem at the Papal Court, were Pope Pius IX appreciated her valor, and occasionally allowed her to accompany him in his walks through the Papal gardens.

To the end of her life, Sr Justine maintained silence about these visions, and spoke only with her superior and her spiritual director about them. The Green Scapular was approved by Pope Pius IX in 1870. 

Sister Justine Bisqueyburu died on 23 September 1903.

Description

The devotional scapular is made of green fabric. The obverse has an image of the burning heart of Mary (without the chaplet of roses), pierced by a sword and dripping blood, above which is a crux immissa, encircled by the words "Immaculate Heart of Mary, pray for us now and at our hour of death." The reverse shows a full standing image of the Blessed Virgin Mary with the radiant Immaculate Heart. It differs from other scapulars in that it consists of only one rectangular piece of cloth instead of two.

Devotional use
Since it is not the emblem of a confraternity but simply a double image attached to a single piece of cloth, no investiture is necessary. The only requirement is that the Green Scapular be blessed by a priest and worn or carried by the person wishing to benefit by it. The Scapular may also be worn about the neck, placed under the pillow, kept in a wallet, or placed in one's clothing. The prayer, "Immaculate Heart of Mary, pray for us now and at the hour of our death", should with confidence be said for or by the person.

When invoked under this title and through this holy image, the Virgin Mary is said to obtain great favours from her Son, especially in the areas of physical health, peace of mind and spiritual conversion. She would particularly obtain the conversion of those who had fallen away from the faith.

See also

 Brown Scapular
 Blue Scapular
 Red Scapular
 Fivefold Scapular
 Miraculous Medal

References

External links
  Free printable images for making Green Scapulars
 University of Dayton - Guide to the Marian devotional scapular collection
 Society of the Green Scapular
 Fr Marie Edouard Mott: The Green Scapular and its favors. - audiobook, Youtube.com

Scapulars
Catholic devotions